Edward Stefanski is an American sports executive and former professional basketball player. He currently is the Senior advisor of the Detroit Pistons of the National Basketball Association (NBA).

Career
Stefanski grew up in Delaware County, Pennsylvania, attending St. Bernadette's Grade school in Drexel Hill as the star player on both the football and basketball teams. He then attended Monsignor Bonner High School in Upper Darby where he was a "Wall-of Fame" basketball standout at Bonner and then went on to play college basketball, as 'the shot', at the University of Pennsylvania. Stefanski was a 10th round selection of the Philadelphia 76ers in the 1976 NBA draft.

In 2014, Stefanski was hired as vice president of player personnel for the Memphis Grizzlies of the National Basketball Association (NBA). Prior to joining the Grizzlies, Stefanski served as executive vice president of basketball operations for the Toronto Raptors from 2011 to 2013, and general manager of the Philadelphia 76ers from 2007 to 2011. He was dismissed by the new 76ers ownership led by Josh Harris. Stefanski previously worked for the New Jersey Nets from 1999 to 2007 as director of scouting, senior vice president of basketball operations, and general manager.

On May 24, 2018, Stefanski was named senior adviser to the owner of the Detroit Pistons.

In 2020, Stefanski received one 3rd place vote for NBA Executive of the Year.

Personal life
Stefanski is a resident of Avalon, New Jersey. He is the father of current Cleveland Browns Head Coach Kevin Stefanski.

See also 
List of National Basketball Association team presidents

References

Year of birth missing (living people)
Living people
American men's basketball players
American people of Polish descent
Detroit Pistons executives
National Basketball Association general managers
Penn Quakers men's basketball players
People from Avalon, New Jersey
Philadelphia 76ers draft picks
Sportspeople from Philadelphia
Toronto Raptors executives
Wharton School of the University of Pennsylvania alumni
Basketball players from Philadelphia